Lepidochrysops kitale, the Kitale giant Cupid, is a butterfly in the family Lycaenidae. It is found in north-western Kenya. The habitat consists of savanna.

References

Butterflies described in 1936
Lepidochrysops
Endemic insects of Kenya
Butterflies of Africa